Emerson Feliciano De Barros Freitas Carvalho known as Emerson (born 22 July 1983) is a Brazilian footballer who plays for Juazeirense, as a defender.

External links
 
 
 

1983 births
Living people
Brazilian footballers
Associação Portuguesa de Desportos players
Clube Atlético Juventus players
Marília Atlético Clube players
Clube de Regatas Brasil players
Esporte Clube Santo André players
Treze Futebol Clube players
Fortaleza Esporte Clube players
G.D. Estoril Praia players
América Futebol Clube (RN) players
Sociedade Esportiva e Recreativa Caxias do Sul players
Campinense Clube players
Uberlândia Esporte Clube players
Clube Atlético Bragantino players
Ypiranga Futebol Clube players
Agremiação Sportiva Arapiraquense players
Veranópolis Esporte Clube Recreativo e Cultural players
Clube Recreativo e Atlético Catalano players
São José Esporte Clube players
Nacional Futebol Clube players
Paulista Futebol Clube players
Águia de Marabá Futebol Clube players
Rio Branco Esporte Clube players
Associação Desportiva Recreativa e Cultural Icasa players
Sociedade Desportiva Juazeirense players
Boa Esporte Clube players
FC Zimbru Chișinău players
Place of birth missing (living people)
S.R. Almancilense players
Association football defenders